Xinzhuang Lisu and Dai Ethnic Township is an ethnic township in Huaping County, Yunnan, China.

Administrative division 
As of 2016, the township is divided into seven villages: 
 Xinzhuang
 Tianxing
 Bian'ao
 Bade
 Liangma
 Desheng
 Lame

History 
In the Daoguang period (1821–1850) of the Qing dynasty (1644–1911), there is a house named "Xinzhuang". Since than, more and more people settled down and formed a market.

In 1931, it belonged to the 5th District. The Xinbang Township was set up in 1937.

After the establishment of the Communist State, in 1951, Xinabng Township and Qilian Township merged to form the 4th District. In 1958, it was renamed "Xinzhuang People's Commune". Its name was changed to "Xinzhuang District" in 1983. In 1988, Xinzhuang Township separated from the district.

Geography 
The township is situated at the western Huaping County.

The Liangma River, Bian'ao River and Xinzhuang River converged in this area.

Economy 
The region's economy is based on agriculture, animal husbandry, and nearby mineral resources. Vegetable, Dendrocalamus latiflorus and tobacco are the mainly economic plants of this region. Other commercial crops include citrus, walnut, zanthoxylum, mango. The region also has an abundance of coal, granite, limestone, kaolinite, feldspar, talc, gypsum, iron, and copper.

Demographics 

As of 2017, the National Bureau of Statistics of China estimates the township's population now to be 17,526. There are 10 ethnic groups in the town, such as Yi, Dai, Miao, Nakhi, and Lisu.

Transportation 
The township is connected to two highways: the China National Highway 353 and G4216 Expressway.

References

Bibliography 

Divisions of Huaping County